Tim C. Winter  is an Australian sociologist and international relations (IR) scholar, Professor and Senior Research Fellow at Asia Research Institute, National University of Singapore. His research interests revolve around understanding how cultural heritage influences public audiences and features in issues such as urban development, diplomacy, geopolitics, post-conflict recovery, sustainability, postcolonial identities, and nationalism. He has contributed to the conceptual development of heritage diplomacy and introduced geocultural power to the analysis of IR. He was previously an Australian Research Council Professorial Future Fellow, Professor of Critical Heritage Studies (CHS) at the University of Western Australia, and Research Professor in CHS at Cultural Heritage Centre for Asia and the Pacific, Deakin University. He was the Editor of Historic Environment (2006-2015). He is President of the Association of Critical Heritage Studies.

Publications 
 Post-Conflict Heritage, Postcolonial Tourism: Culture, Politics and Development at Angkor (Routledge, 2007)
 Geocultural Power: China’s Quest to Revive the Silk Roads for the Twenty First Century (University of Chicago Press, 2019)
 The Silk Road: Connecting histories and futures (Oxford University Press, 2022)

References 

Living people
Australian sociologists
Year of birth missing (living people)